National Route 143 is a national highway of Japan connecting Matsumoto, Nagano and Ueda, Nagano in Japan, with a total length of .

References

143
Roads in Nagano Prefecture